The Allied Democratic Forces insurgency is an ongoing conflict waged by the Allied Democratic Forces in Uganda and the Democratic Republic of the Congo, against the governments of those two countries and the MONUSCO. The insurgency began in 1996, intensifying in 2013, resulting in hundreds of deaths. The ADF is known to currently control a number of hidden camps which are home to about 2,000 people; in these camps, the ADF operates as a proto-state with "an internal security service, a prison, health clinics, and an orphanage" as well as schools for boys and girls.

Background
The ADF was formed by Jamil Mukulu, an ultra conservative Ugandan Muslim, belonging to the Tablighi Jamaat group. Mukulu was born as David Steven and was baptised as a Catholic, later converting to Islam, adopting a Muslim name and becoming radicalised. He reportedly spent the early 1990s in Khartoum, Sudan, coming into personal contact with Osama bin Laden.

ADF merged with the remnants of another rebel group, the National Army for the Liberation of Uganda (NALU), during the years following the fall of Idi Amin. ADF-NALU's initial goal was to overthrow Ugandan president's Yoweri Museveni government, replacing it with an Islamic fundamentalist state. The group went on to recruit former officers of the Ugandan army, as well as volunteers from Tanzania and Somalia. Funded by the illegal mining and logging industries of the Democratic Republic of the Congo, ADF created 15 well organised camps in the Rwenzori Mountains, located in the DRC-Uganda border areas. The insurgence remained unaffected by government amnesty and talk efforts, as members married local women.

According to intelligence sources, ADF has collaborated with al-Shabaab and Lord's Resistance Army. Receiving training and logistic support, with limited direct involvement from al-Shabaab's side. Other alleged sponsors of the faction include Sudanese Islamist politician Hassan al-Turabi and former DRC president Mobutu Sese Seko.

Formed in 1989, ADF carried out its first attacks in 1995. The conflict gradually intensified, culminating in the 1998 Kichwamba Technical College attack, which left 80 people dead, with 80 more being abducted. By 2002, continuous pressure from the Ugandan Army forced ADF to relocate most of its activities into the neighboring Democratic Republic of the Congo. The insurgency continued on a smaller scale until 2013, which marked a resurgence of ADF activity, with the group launching a recruitment campaign along with numerous attacks.

Beni killings

A report of The Congo Research Group at New York University, released in September 2017, indicted the Congolese Army commanders of orchestrating the massacres in Beni from 2014 to 2016. It cited multiple witnesses saying that army commanders, including the former top general in the zone, supported and in some cases organized the killings. Sources told it that during some massacres, soldiers secured the perimeter so that victims could not escape. It stated that the first massacres were orchestrated in 2013 by former leaders of the rebel group Popular Congolese Army (APC), which fought in the Congo War of 1998–2003 to create a new rebellion and undermine confidence in the central government of DRC. These rebels were working with ADF per the report. However, when the massacres began, the army commanders co-opted many of the networks of the local militias to weaken their rivals.

Timeline

1996
On 13 November 1996, ADF perpetrated its first large-scale attack on the towns of Bwera and Mpondwe-Lhubiriha in Kasese district, Uganda. Approximately 50 people were killed in the attack. 25,000 people fled the towns, before they were recaptured by Ugandan troops.

1998
On 20 February 1998, ADF abducted 30 children, in the aftermath of an attack on a Seventh-Day Adventist College in Mitandi, Kasese district.

On 4 April 1998, 5 people were killed and at least 6 were wounded, when bombs exploded at two restaurants in Kampala.

On 8 June 1998, ADF rebels killed 80 students of the Kichwamba Technical College in Kabarole District, Uganda. 80 students were abducted in the same raid.

In June 1998, ADF rebels abducted over 100 school children from a school in Hoima, Uganda.

In August 1998, 30 people were killed in three separate bus bombings, perpetrated by ADF.

1999
Between 10 April 1999 – 30 May 1999 ADF carried out seven attacks, resulting in 11 dead and 42 wounded.

On 9 December 1999, ADF attacked the Katojo prison facility, releasing 360 prisoners held for terrorism.

2007 to 2008

During March 2007, the UPDF engaged ADF groups in multiple firefights, killing at least 46 in Bundibugyo and Mubende districts. The biggest battle occurred on March 27, when the UPDF faced an estimated 60 ADF troops and killed 34, including three senior commanders. The UPDF claimed to have retrieved numerous weapons as well as documents that tie the ADF to the LRA.

On 13 April 2007, the UPDF and ADF engaged in an intense battle inside the Semuliki National Park, near the upscale Semliki Lodge tourist destination.

Ceasefire and amnesty talks between the government of Uganda and the ADF were held in Nairobi starting in May 2008. Negotiations were complicated by the fragmentation of the ADF's leadership. Non-combatant dependents of the ADF were repatriated to Uganda by the IOM. At least 48 ADF fighters surrendered and were given amnesty. As the threat from the LRA in the DRC waned, the UPDF put increasing focus on the ADF as a reason for UPDF personnel to remain in the DRC.

On 4 December 2007, 200 ADF and NALU militants surrendered to Ugandan authorities.

2012
Between February 2012 to March 2012, over 60 ADF insurgents were arrested within Uganda.

2013
On 24 January 2013, insurgents tortured and later executed 13 people who were previously abducted from the city of Oicha, North Kivu.

In April 2013, it was reported that ADF started a recruitment campaign in Kampala and other parts of the country. Citing a defector from ADF, "allAfrica" reported that some 10 new recruits joined ADF forces every day.

In July 2013, the ADF renewed its fighting in the Congolese district of Beni. According to the UN Radio Okapi, the ADF together with the NALU, fought a pitched battle with the FARD, briefly taking the towns of Mamundioma and Totolito. On July 11, the ADF attacked the town of Kamango, triggering the flight of over 60,000 refugees across the border into the Ugandan district of Bundibugyo.

Early in September 2013, regional leaders under the International Conference of the Great Lakes Region (ICGLR) asked the recently formed combative Intervention Brigade under MONUSCO to attack positions of foreign negative forces operating in DRC, including the ADF.

On 23 September 2013, 3 people were killed during an ADF attack in the Watalinga Sector, North Kivu, DRC.

On 27 September 2013, ADF militants killed five and abducted 30 people in an attack on a health center in the city of Maleki, DRC.

On 23 October 2013, ADF guerrillas abducted 26 people from the village of Upira, North Kivu, later transferring them to the rebel strongholds of Makembi and Chuchubo.

In the period between November 2012 and November 2013, ADF carried out 300 kidnappings.

On 14 December 2013, 13 people were killed, in the aftermath of an ADF attack on the Musuku village, Uganda.

On 15 December 2013, ADF killed eight people in the Biangolo village, Uganda.

On 25 December 2013, ADF rebels attacked the city of Kamango, DRC. Over 50 civilians were killed and many buildings were burnt down. The city was retaken by the Congolese army the following day.

On 29 December 2013, ADF rebels launched another attack on the city of Kamango. The ADF militants beheaded 21 civilians and urged the residents of the city to flee to Uganda.

2014
On 17 January 2014, the Congolese army drove ADF militants soldiers out of the city of Beni, with the aid of UN's "Intervention Brigade" peace corps.

On 17 February 2014, a Congolese army spokesman announced that the military had killed 230 ADF rebels in the aftermath of a monthlong offensive, 23 FARDC soldiers were also killed in the operation.

On 23 March 2014, South African helicopters struck ADF forces for the first time, in support of Operation Sukola 1.

Between 5–8 October 2014, ADF militants killed 15 people, within the North Kivu province, DRC.

On 15 October 2014, ADF rebels killed 27 people in an attack on villages, located outside Beni.

On 18 October 2014, ADF insurgents killed over 20 people, in an attack on the village of Byalos, DRC.

On 31 October 2014, a crowd stoned to death, burned and then ate a suspected ADF insurgent in the town of Beni. The incident came after a number of ADF raids, that brought the October's civilian death toll to over 100 people.

On 20 November 2014, rebels disguised as Congolese soldiers killed between 50 and 80 people near Beni.

On 8 December 2014, militants hacked to death 36 civilians in the vicinity of Beni.

On 26 December 2014, an ADF attack resulted in the deaths of 11 people, in the village of Ndumi, Ituri.

2015
On 4 January 2015, a joint MONUSCO – FARDC offensive forced ADF militants out of the Mavure village, North Kivu. One rebel was killed, as government forces seized large amounts of drugs and training materials.

On 5 February 2015, ADF carried out a night raid on the city of Beni hacking to death 23 people and injuring one.

On 9 March 2015, ADF rebels killed one and injured two civilians in the area of the Semliki bridge, North Kivu.

On 15 April 2015, an ADF attack on the villages of Matiba and Kinzika, Beni-Mbau sector, DRC, led to the deaths of 18 people.

On 23 April 2015, ADF rebels massacred five civilians in the village of Kalongo, 6 km northwest of Oïcha.

On 30 April 2015, the Ugandan media reported that the ADF's leader, Jamil Mukulu, had been arrested in Tanzania.

On 8 May 2015, suspected ADF guerrillas attacked the Matembo neighborhood of the town of Mulekere, North Kivu. Seven people were slain in the attack bringing the region's 2015 death toll to over 300 casualties.

In early December 2015, the ADF seized a MONUSCO base in North Kivu, killing a Malawian UN soldier in doing so. South African UN forces later retook the base, attacking with Rooivalk attack helicopters.

2016

29 February – Thirteen civilians were killed by suspected Ugandan rebels in the Beni territory in eastern DRC. The killings took place in the village of Ntombi, located about 40 km northeast of Beni, an area massacres and recurrent attacks attributed to Allied Democratic Forces, a rebel group opposed to the Ugandan government and is considered a terrorist organisation.

20 March – A priest of the Congregation of Caracholine Nyamilima was shot and critically wounded like his driver and a child present in the same car. The attackers was the Allied Democratic Forces, a rebel group opposed to the Ugandan government and is considered a terrorist organisation

In early May 2016, assailants from the ADF armed with machetes hacked at least 16 civilians to death in the eastern Democratic Republic of the Congo.

According to the Congolese military, at least nine people were hacked to death in an ADF attack in a village 30 km north of Beni in July 2016.

The ADF has been blamed for the Beni massacre.

2017

7 October – ADF fighters ambush a group of state officials near Beni, killing 22.

8 October – The ADF attacks a UN base in Goma, killing two peacekeepers and wounding 12.

8 December – Hundreds of ADF insurgents launch a coordinated attack on a UN base in North Kivu province, killing at least 15 UN peacekeepers and five Congolese soldiers in a protracted, hours-long gun battle before finally withdrawing. 72 insurgents are also killed in the firefight.

2018
15 January – Three Democratic Republic of Congo soldiers were killed while repelling an attack in the eastern Beni region by ADF Ugandan extremist rebels. Five others were wounded.

2 February – Three people were killed in an attack by rebels of the ADF who also looted a hospital in the eastern Democratic Republic of Congo.

3 March – Six people were shot dead and another was stabbed to death in a raid by ADF rebels in the village of Eringeti in Democratic Republic of Congo's North Kivu province.

5–6 March – Twenty people were killed in several attacks by the ADF in the province of North Kivu in the Democratic Republic of Congo. More than 15 others were reported missing after the attacks and probably kidnapped by the attackers.

8 September – Muhammad Kirumira, the former police commissioner for Uganda's Buyende District, is gunned down by several assassins. A female friend of Kirumira's is also killed in the attack. In 2019, Ugandan authorities link the attack to the ADF and arrest two suspects. A third suspect dies in a shootout with police on September 28.

4 October – ADF militants attacked an army outpost in Beni, Democratic Republic of Congo killing at least 6 people.

3 November – Allied Democratic Forces Rebels killed at least 7 people and abducted 15 others including 10 children in raids and attacks in the DRC's North Kivu province.

16 November – An ADF ambush near Beni, DRC, leaves 8 UN peacekeepers and 12 Congolese soldiers dead and 10 peacekeepers wounded. Additionally, one peacekeeper remains missing.

22 November – Unidentified rebels, presumed to be ADF militants, open fire on a UN helicopter near the Ugandan border in eastern DRC. UN forces return fire before retreating back to base. Although the helicopter is damaged, there are no recorded casualties.

27 November – ADF militants launch a nighttime assault on Oicha, DRC, killing six civilians. Congolese soldiers successfully repel the assault, killing one insurgent.

11 December – ADF insurgents bypass Congolese army units and launch a second nighttime attack on Oicha, killing nine civilians and looting several homes.

23 December – ADF forces attack the village of Masiani, just outside Beni, DRC, killing four civilians and a soldier. Three civilians are wounded.

27 December – Protesters in Beni attack a medical holding center for patients infected with the Ebola virus, burning three tents and looting supplies. Congolese authorities blame the ADF.

2019
7 January – ADF insurgents launch an attack on a market in the village of Mavivi, just north of Beni. Eight civilians (five of them children) are killed outright and at least two others later die of their injuries. Dozens of homes and farms are looted.

9 January – ADF insurgents attack a Congolese army outpost in Beni. Three Congolese soldiers and seven civilians are killed in the resulting gun battle. An additional two Congolese soldiers are wounded.

21 January – ADF insurgents attack Congolese soldiers in the village of Mapou, just outside Oicha.

24 January – Three people are killed and two others were wounded in an ambush attack by presumed members of the ADF, in the province of North Kivu, on a highway that led to the city of Beni, four vehicles were left damaged by bullets.

12 February – Congolese soldiers attack an ADF camp in Mamove, about 50 kilometers outside of Beni. Four insurgents are killed in the resulting firefight, and four hostages are rescued. Congolese soldiers also recover medicine that had been previously looted by the ADF.

8 March – A park ranger is shot dead by unknown assailants in Virunga National Park. Congolese authorities blame the ADF for the killing.

19 March – ADF fighters, disguised as security officers, infiltrate and attack Kalau, a majority-Christian village located just outside Beni. The resulting 4-hour assault kills six Christian civilians, including a 9-month-old child, and forces nearly 500 others to flee their homes.

2 April – Ugandan authorities report that the ADF has begun establishing bases in Mozambique's Cabo Delgado Province.

5 April – 35-year-old American tourist Kimberly Sue Endicott and her native guide are kidnapped by a group of armed gunmen in Queen Elizabeth National Park, near the Uganda-DRC border. Endicott and her guide are released two days later after authorities reach a settlement with the kidnappers. 
Although the assailants have not been identified, it is strongly suspected by both Ugandan authorities and the United States that the ADF is behind the abduction.

29 May – Suspected ADF fighters launch a massive assault on Congolese army barracks and UN Peacekeeping forces in the village of Ngite, near Mavivi, DRC. After the militants briefly capture the barracks, a joint UN-Congolese army counterattack inflicts heavy losses on the ADF, which withdraws following an intense firefight. At least 26 insurgents are killed in the gun battle. One South African UN Peacekeeper is wounded by a shot to the foot. Dozens of weapons, including AK-47s, machetes, grenades, mortars, and PKM machine guns, are recovered.
The Islamic State of Iraq and the Levant claims responsibility for the attack.

4 June – ADF fighters attack a village in northeastern Beni, DRC, in an Ebola zone. 13 civilians and two Congolese soldiers are killed in the attack and a teenage girl is abducted by the militants. Congolese soldiers successfully repel the assault, killing one attacker.
Clashes resume in the area later in the day. ISIL again claims responsibility for the attack.

7 June – Officials from Rwanda, Uganda, Tanzania, and the DRC meet in Kinshasa to discuss a joint response to the ADF insurgency in North Kivu.

22 July – ADF militants attack the cities of Eringeti and Oicha, killing a total of 12 civilians (nine in Eringeti and three in Oicha). 10 civilians, including children, are abducted. That same day, the ADF clashes with Congolese soldiers in the towns of Mangboko and Masulukwed, resulting in 11 fatalities. ISIL claims responsibility for the attacks.

27 August – A major ADF attack on Boga in the DRC's Ituri Province results in the abduction of 100–200 civilians and the looting of livestock, medicine, and food. Congolese soldiers engage in combat with the attackers, but no casualties are reported and there are conflicting reports of the effectiveness of the military's response. The attack lasts for about three hours.

5 September – Tanzanian soldiers detain a truck full of cows destined for the DRC, alleging the shipment was arranged by ADF supporters to provide food for insurgents in the Congo.

14 September – Congolese soldiers repel a suspected ADF attack on the town of Kitchanga. The Islamic State of Iraq and the Levant claims responsibility for the assault.

31 October – The Congolese army launched a large scale offensive against the ADF in the Beni Territory of the North Kivu Province. According to spokesman General Leon Richard Kasonga, "The DRC armed forces launched large-scale operations overnight Wednesday to eradicate all domestic and foreign armed groups that plague the east of the country and destabilize the Great Lakes region." The operation is being carried out by the FARDC without any foreign support. The focus is primarily on the ADF but also other armed groups are being targeted.

13 November – Ukrainian Mil Mi-24 helicopters operated by MONUSCO conduct airstrikes on an ADF insurgent group attacking an army base near the Semuliki River. The militants retreat into the surrounding woods following the airstrikes. No peacekeepers are reported injured.

15–16 November – During the night of November 14–15, ADF insurgents attack a neighborhood in Beni, looting shops and homes. At least 15 civilians are killed, many of them by machete. It is believed the ADF carried out the attack in response to the renewed Congolese army offensive. According to Congolese authorities, more than 40 civilians have been killed in such attacks since the Congolese army began a renewed offensive in early November.

30 November – Congolese soldiers kill a high-ranking ADF commander, Mouhamed Islam Mukubwa, during an assault in the Mapobu forest in northeastern North Kivu. Mukubwa was described as one of the three major leaders of the ADF. Another senior ADF leader, Nasser Abdullayi Kikuku, was also killed earlier in the month.

6 December – Two ADF attacks in the villages of Mantumbi and Kolokoko kill 17 civilians – two of whom are beheaded by machete.

10 December – The United States imposes sanctions on ADF leader Musa Baluku and five other Congolese Islamist rebels.

2020

 
13 January – 30 Congolese soldiers are killed and 70 are wounded in an intense battle with ADF militants at the ADF's headquarters camp, nicknamed "Madina", near Beni. 40 ADF insurgents are also reported killed, including five top commanders. The Congolese army nevertheless captures the camp, but fails to apprehend the target of the raid, ADF leader Musa Baluku.

28 January – ADF militants hack 38 civilians to death with machetes in Oicha.

30 January – ADF militants kill 21 civilians in three separate attacks on Oicha, Ache, and Mandumbi.

8 February – ADF militants kill eight civilians and abduct 20 others in Magina, near Beni. The militants retreat after being confronted by police.

9 February – 60 ADF fighters attack the village of Makeke, DRC, and kill seven civilians. Congolese soldiers and UN Peacekeepers respond and pursue the fleeing militants into the woods. After being cornered, 40 ADF fighters surrender to the Congolese army.

17 February – An ADF attack in Beni kills at least eight civilians, an intelligence agent, and a Congolese soldier.

18 February – ADF militants kill 12 civilians and burn down several houses in a village east of Beni.

19 February – Five civilians taken hostage by the ADF are found murdered near Virunga National Park.

24–25 February – Congolese soldiers and ADF insurgents clash on two occasions in the Kadohu village in Beni after government forces intercept an ADF raiding party. Seven ADF fighters and 2 Congolese soldiers are killed, and one ADF fighter is captured.

28 February – The Congolese army releases a statement claiming to have pushed the ADF out of their last stronghold in the Beni region.

1 March – ADF fighters are accused of killing 24 civilians and 12 others in an attack on a village in Ituri province.

9–25 March – Scattered clashes in eastern Congo kill 14 Congolese soldiers and 62 ADF insurgents.

20–24 March – Heavy fighting outside Beni kills 12 Congolese soldiers and 37 ADF insurgents. Congolese military officers report that the ADF's influence in North Kivu has been reduced by 80%.

30 March – The ADF releases 38 hostages following a skirmish that left two civilians and one Congolese soldier dead.

6 April – An ADF attack on the town of Halungpa (18 miles away from Beni) kills six civilians, including a child.

14 April – A civilian is killed in an ADF attack on Beni. The Congolese army repels the assault in a skirmish that leaves two soldiers and five insurgents dead.

24 May – 9 civilians killed in an ADF attack on Beni, the ADF burned several houses to the ground as well. The army claimed they killed 17 of the attackers.

25 May – 17 civilians killed in an ADF on the village of Makutano.

26 May – At least 40 civilians were killed with machetes in an attack by the ADF on a village in Ituri province. The ADF also looted food and valuables in the attack.

16 June – 6 Civilians including 4 women were killed and 6 more missing in an ADF attack along the Eringeti-Kainama road in North Kivu. More than 60 homes were also burned by the ADF in the attack.

19 June – 9 Civilians were kidnapped then killed by the ADF.

20 June – 10 Civilians were killed when the ADF Attacked the village of Bukaka.

20 June – Another 10 Civilians were killed when the ADF attacked the village of Biangolo.

21 June – 10 Civilians were killed when the ADF attacked the village of Vukaka.

22 June – A UN Indonesian peacekeeper was killed and another injured in an attack on their patrol. The attack took place in the town of Makisabo near the city of Beni in the North Kivu province.

22 August – ADF killed 13 civilians during raids on the villages of Kinziki-Matiba and Wikeno.

8 September – ADF militants, fleeing military pressure in Beni, stormed the village of Tshabi, killing 23 people.

10 September – ADF militants once again attacked Tshabi in Ituri province, killing 35 people. It was the second attack on the town in Irumu territory in two days. The terrorists assaulted civilians with knives and firearms and destroyed the villages.

20 September – ADF rebels killed 10 civilians in the town of Mbau.

25 September – Eleven bodies were found in the town of Mutuanga after an ADF attack at night.

5 October – Six were killed when the ADF attacked the town of Mamove.

5 October – The ADF together with the Mai-Mai Kyandenga attack FARDC troops in the Mamove locality killing 10 civilians.

20 October – 1,335 prisoners were freed when the ADF attacked Kangbayi central prison and a military camp that provided security to it in Beni. 2 inmates were killed in the attack.

28–30 October – 40 people were killed in ADF attacks in the villages of Baeti and Lisasa.  People were also kidnapped and churches set on fire.

30 October – 21 civilians were killed during ADF raids on the villages of Kamwiri, Kitsimba, and Lisasa. 20 civilians were also abducted and fire was set to many buildings including a Catholic church.

17 November – 29 bodies were found in Virunga National Park after being killed by ADF terrorists.

22 December – 4 civilians and 1 soldier were killed in an attack on Bulongo.

30 December – ADF captures Loselose village.

31 December – 25 civilians were massacred by ADF on New Year's Eve in the village of Tingwe.

2021 

1 January – DRC army supported by UN peacekeepers captures village of Loseslose from ADF. Two DRC soldiers and 14 ADF militiamen were killed during the fighting, seven DRC soldiers were wounded as well.

4 January – 25 civilians were killed and several more kidnapped by ADF during their attacks on Tingwe, Mwenda and Nzenga villages. Secretary-General of the United Nations, António Guterres again called for global ceasefire after the killings, he also urged DRC "to take concrete steps to address the drivers of conflict in the east of the country". Local leaders Bozy Sindiwako and Muvunga Kimwele said that army intervened too late to push back the rebels. DRC officials announced that they discovered 21 bodies which were "in a state of decomposition" in Loselose and Loulo.

15 January –  Three soldiers and 13 civilians were killed when suspected ADF militants attacked the village of Ndalya, 60 miles south of the city of Bunia in Ituri province.

1 March – 10 civilians were killed in 2 different attacks by suspected ADF militants in eastern DRC. 8 were slain in the Boyo village, with 2 more in the Kainama village.

31 March – 23 civilians were killed in a village near Beni.

31 May – 57 civilians were killed in displacement camps near the towns of Boga and Tchabi in eastern DRC, according to the UN.

1 July – US Ambassador to the Democratic Republic of the Congo, Michael A. Hammer, announces that the US government will assist in training Congolese forces and with intelligence sharing.

8 December – suspected ADF fighters killed 16 people in the rural communes of Mangina and nearby Masiriko in North Kivu province of DRC.

2022 

 2 February - Plaine Savo massacre

2023 

 15 January - Kasindi church bombing
 22 January -  Makugwe massacre

References

Works cited 

 

Insurgency
Civil wars involving the states and peoples of Africa
Conflicts in 1996
Insurgencies in Africa
Military history of the Democratic Republic of the Congo
Military history of Uganda
Proxy wars
Wars involving the Democratic Republic of the Congo
Wars involving Uganda
1990s conflicts
2000s conflicts
2010s conflicts
2020s conflicts
1990s in the Democratic Republic of the Congo
2000s in the Democratic Republic of the Congo
2010s in the Democratic Republic of the Congo
2020s in the Democratic Republic of the Congo
1990s in Uganda
2000s in Uganda
2010s in Uganda
2020s in Uganda